Isaac Antonio Palma Olivares (born October 26, 1990 in Zitácuaro, Michoacán) is a Mexican racewalker. He has represented Mexico in multiple international competitions. He began to practice racewalking in 2005 in his hometown.  In 2008, he joined the Alfredo Harp Helu Foundation as a sports prospectus and then entered the CNAR this year.  In 2008 he competed for the first time internationally in the World Cup in Chevoksary Russia. He competed for Mexico in 20 kilometres walk at the 2012 Summer Olympics in London.  In 2019, he won the 50 km race at the Pan American Race Walking Cup. In 2019, he competed in the men's 50 kilometres walk at the 2019 World Athletics Championships held in Doha, Qatar. He did not finish his race.

His younger brother, Ever, is also a racewalker.

References

External links

1990 births
Living people
Mexican male racewalkers
Sportspeople from Michoacán
People from Zitácuaro
Olympic athletes of Mexico
Athletes (track and field) at the 2012 Summer Olympics
Athletes (track and field) at the 2019 Pan American Games
Pan American Games competitors for Mexico
Athletes (track and field) at the 2020 Summer Olympics
21st-century Mexican people